The 2020 Pan American Wrestling Championships was held in Ottawa, Canada, from 6 to 9 March 2020.

Team ranking

Medal table

Medalists

Men's freestyle

Men's Greco-Roman

Women's freestyle

References

External links
Official website

Pan American Wrestling Championships
Pan America
Pan American Wrestling Championships
2020 Pan American Wrestling Championships
Sports competitions in Ottawa
Pan American Wrestling Championships